Inuzuka (written 犬塚 lit. "dog mound") is a Japanese surname. Notable people with the surname include:

, Imperial Japanese Navy officer
, Japanese film director and screenwriter
, Japanese politician
, Japanese footballer

Fictional characters
Kiba Inuzuka, a character in the manga series Naruto
, a character in the manga series Gender-Swap at the Delinquent Academy
, a character in the manga series Sweetness and Lightning
Kōshi Inuzuka, a character in the manga series Sumomomo Momomo

Japanese-language surnames